Kenneth Parkin (20 February 1921 – 2 July 1973) was a New Zealand cricketer. He played in two first-class matches for Wellington from 1942 to 1946.

See also
 List of Wellington representative cricketers

References

External links
 

1921 births
1973 deaths
New Zealand cricketers
Wellington cricketers
Cricketers from Wellington City
Royal New Zealand Air Force cricketers